The 2017–18 Honduran Liga Nacional de Ascenso was the 51st season of the Second level in Honduran football and the 16th under the name Liga Nacional de Ascenso.  The tournament was divided into two halves (Apertura and Clausura), each crowning one champion.  As winners of both tournaments, Infop RNP was promoted to 2018–19 Honduran Liga Nacional.

Apertura
The Apertura tournament ran from 19 August to 30 December 2017.  Infop RNP obtained the title after defeating Villanueva F.C. with a 2–1 aggregate score in the final series.

Regular season

Standings

Postseason

Play-offs

Quarterfinals

Semifinals

Final

Clausura
The Clausura tournament was played in the first half of 2018.

Regular season

Standings

Postseason

Play-offs

Quarterfinals

 Note: Yoro and Estrella Roja finished with a 3–3 aggregated score.  Estrella Roja was disqualified for abandoning the second leg by not accepting a late penalty at the 89th minute.

Semifinals

Final

Promotion
As winners of both Apertura and Clausura, Infop RNP was automatically promoted to 2018–19 Honduran Liga Nacional and no promotion play off was required.

References

Ascenso
2017